Stephen John Schmoll (born February 4, 1980) is a former Major League Baseball pitcher. He bats and throws right-handed.

Schmoll graduated from the University of Maryland, College Park. In , he played for the Bethesda Big Train. On January 4, 2006, the Dodgers traded Schmoll and Duaner Sánchez to the New York Mets for Jae Seo and Tim Hamulack.

Schmoll signed with the Washington Nationals for the  season after being released by the Mets in spring training. He spent the entire year with the Harrisburg Senators, and he has not pitched since.

References

External links

1980 births
Living people
Baseball players from Maryland
Harrisburg Senators players
Jacksonville Suns players
Las Vegas 51s players
Los Angeles Dodgers players
Major League Baseball pitchers
Maryland Terrapins baseball players
Navegantes del Magallanes players
American expatriate baseball players in Venezuela
New Orleans Zephyrs players
Norfolk Tides players
Ogden Raptors players
People from Silver Spring, Maryland
University of Maryland, College Park alumni
Vero Beach Dodgers players